Oscar Lindberg may refer to:

 Oscar Lindberg (cross-country skier) (1894–1977), competitor in the 1924 Winter Olympics
 Oscar Lindberg (ice hockey) (born 1991), ice hockey player

See also
 Oskar Lindberg (disambiguation)